Survivor's Remorse is the fifth studio album by American rapper G Herbo. A double album, the A Side was released on October 7, 2022, and the B Side was released three days later. The album features guest appearances from his two sons Essex and Yosohn, Jeremih, Offset, Future, Benny the Butcher, Gunna, A Boogie wit da Hoodie, Young Thug, Conway the Machine, and Kodak Black.

Track listing

Charts

References

2022 albums
G Herbo albums
Albums produced by D. A. Doman
Albums produced by Southside (record producer)
Albums produced by Boi-1da
Albums produced by C-Sick